Joseph Davidson may refer to:
Joseph Davidson (cricketer) (1846–1901), English cricketer
Joseph Davidson (rugby union) (1878–1910), English sportsman
Joseph George Davidson (1892–1969), chemist
Joseph Davison (1868–1948), Northern Irish politician
Joseph Davidson Qualtrough (1885–1960), Manx politician
Joseph Davidson Sowerby (1863–1948), British constable
 Joe Davidson (American football) (born 1903)
Josephine Davison, New Zealand actress